Crickmer is an unincorporated community in Fayette County, West Virginia, United States.

The community has the name of Ed Crickmer.

References 

Unincorporated communities in West Virginia
Unincorporated communities in Fayette County, West Virginia